Kiril Trayanov (born December 7, 1977 in Sofia) is a Bulgarian professional vert skater, and skier. Trayanov started skating when he was nine years old in 1986 and turned professional in 2006. Trayanov has won many competitions in his vert skating career; he is a member of Team DISASTER. In 2007 he was awarded for best trick Flatspin 900. Kiril Trayanov is also a cartoon animator and film editor.

Best tricks: Fakie 1080, Flatspin 900

Vert competitions 
2017 British Championship UK 4th
2016 BAUM Festival  Barcelona 3rd
2016 Nass music Festival UK 3rd
2016 British Championship UK 6th
2015 European Championship Inline, Rome, Italy: 1st 
2012 
European Championship Inline, Moscow, Russia: 5th
European Championship Inline, Copenhagen, Denmark: 5th
2011
Montana Spring Sessions, Montana, Bulgaria: 2nd
Barcelona Extreme, Barcelona, Spain: 2nd
European Cup, Moscow, Russia: 5th
2010 
Movistar Barcelona Extreme, Barcelona, Spain: 4th
European Championship Inline 2nd round, Rotterdam, Denmark: 4th
European Championship Inline 3rd round, Moscow, Russia: 9th 
European Championship Inline 5th round, Montana, Bulgaria: 5th
European Cup, Berlin, Germany: 8th
2009 
Movistar Barcelona Extreme, Barcelona, Spain: 6th
European Championship Inline Vert, Montana, Bulgaria: 8th
European Championship Inline Vert Finals, Rotterdam, Denmark: 8th
German Masters Inline Halfpipe, Berlin, Germany: 14th
SAG European Challenge Halfpipe, Berlin, Germany: 12th
2008 
Montana Spring Sessions, Montana, Bulgaria: 1st
Snickers European Championships, Montana, Bulgaria: 2nd
2007 
BTK Professional Inline Vert Comp, Montana, Bulgaria: 2nd
European Inline Vert Challenge, Berlin, Germany: 3rd
German Half-Pipe Masters, Berlin, Germany: 4th
2006 
Amateur Championships, Dallas, TX - Vert: 4th
European Inline Vert Championship, Montana, Bulgaria - Vert: 2nd
Open Inline Vert Contest, Montana, Bulgaria - Vert: 2nd
Rennes sur Roulettes, Rennes, France - Vert: 2nd
2005 
SAG European Challenge, Berlin, Germany - Vert: 9th
Razors German Masters Inline Vert Comp, Berlin, Germany: 4th
Amateur World Championships, Manchester, UK - Vert: 8th
Slovenia Inline Vert Competition, Nova Gorica - Vert: 2nd
2004 
Bulgarian National Inline Vert Championships - Vert: 1st
Mountain Dew Vert Competition, Sofia, Bulgaria - Vert: 2nd
2003 
Bulgarian National Inline Vert Championships - Vert: 2nd
2002 
Bulgarian National Inline Vert Championships - Vert: 2nd

Demonstrations
 Children Grow Up Without Violence 2012
 Varna Fun City Festival 2012
 Bulgaria Without Tobacco Smoke 2012

References

External links
actionsportstour.com
http://team-disaster.com/bg/index.php?page=profiles&member=kiro
http://team-disaster.com/bg/index.php?page=main
http://www.rollerbg.com/forum/viewtopic.php?t=99
http://photo-forum.net/en/index.php?APP_ACTION=GALLERY_IMAGE&IMAGE_ID=1273035
https://upload.wikimedia.org/wikipedia/commons/d/d9/Flatspin_900_Kiril_Trayanov.ogv
https://www.youtube.com/user/DISASTER1440fakie/videos
https://vimeo.com/user501281

1977 births
Living people
Vert skaters
X Games athletes
Bulgarian film editors
Bulgarian animators
Sportspeople from Sofia
Bulgarian male skiers